The orangespotted goby (Nes longus) is a species of goby native to the tropical Atlantic coast from Bermuda and southern Florida through the Caribbean Sea and Gulf of Mexico south to the Caribbean coasts of Venezuela and Colombia, where it prefers silty bottoms around reefs.  It is a commensal with an alpheid shrimp.  This species grows to a length of  TL.  This species is the only known member of its genus.

This species is symbiotic with snapper shrimp Alpheus floridanus, sharing the burrow with the shrimps, usually a pair, on unvegetated silty substrates in waters of less than  depth. The goby and its host shrimps interact closely and the goby is dependent on its hosts' burrow for cover. The goby acts as a sentinel, watching for danger from the entrance of the burrow. The diet of the orangespotted goby consists mainly of small gastropods, decapods, ostracods and isopods.

References

External links
 

orangespotted goby
Fish of the Caribbean
Fish of the Dominican Republic
orangespotted goby